This is a list of episodes of the Canadian sitcom Show Me Yours. The series debuted on Showcase on May 26, 2004 and ended May 31, 2005.

Show Me Yours